Horné Semerovce is a village and municipality in the Levice District in the Nitra Region of Slovakia.

History
In historical records the village was first mentioned in 1268.

Geography
The village lies at an altitude of 134 metres and covers an area of 10.09 km2. It has a population of about 625 people.

Ethnicity
The village is approximately 30% Slovak, and 55% Magyar.

Facilities
The village has a public library and a football pitch.

Genealogical resources

The records for genealogical research are available at the state archive "Statny Archiv in Bratislava, Nitra, Slovakia"

 Roman Catholic church records (births/marriages/deaths): 1703-1896 (parish B)
 Lutheran church records (births/marriages/deaths): 1721-1900 (parish B)

See also
 List of municipalities and towns in Slovakia

External links
https://web.archive.org/web/20070513023228/http://www.statistics.sk/mosmis/eng/run.html
Surnames of living people in Horne Semerovce

Villages and municipalities in Levice District